Remogliflozin etabonate (INN/USAN) is a drug of the gliflozin class for the treatment of non-alcoholic steatohepatitis ("NASH") and type 2 diabetes.  Remogliflozin was discovered by the Japanese company Kissei Pharmaceutical and is currently being developed by BHV Pharma, a wholly owned subsidiary of North Carolina USA-based Avolynt, and Glenmark Pharmaceuticals through a collaboration with BHV. Remogliflozin was commercially launched first in India by Glenmark in May 2019.

Clinical trials 
Remogliflozin etabonate was shown to enhance urinary glucose excretion in rodents and humans. Early studies in diabetics improved plasma glucose levels. Remogliflozin etabonate has been studied at doses up to 1000 mg. A pair of 12-week phase 2b randomized clinical trials of diabetics published in 2015, found reductions in glycated hemoglobin and that it was generally well tolerated. In a meta-analysis published by Dutta et al. involving data from 3 randomized controlled trials (535 patients), remogliflozin was noted to have similar glycaemic efficacy (reduction in HbA1c and fasting glucose) as compared to dapagliflozin and pioglitazone.

Method of action
Remogliflozin etabonate is a pro-drug of remogliflozin. Remogliflozin inhibits the sodium-glucose transport proteins (SGLT), which are responsible for glucose reabsorption in the kidney. Blocking this transporter causes blood glucose to be eliminated through the urine. Remogliflozin is selective for SGLT2.

See also 
 Etabonate

References 

SGLT2 inhibitors
Phenol ethers
Pyrazoles
Glucosides
Experimental drugs